Waal is a municipality in the district of Ostallgäu in Bavaria in Germany. The town has a municipal association with Buchloe.

Notable people 
Hubert von Herkomer, artist, owner of Lululaund.

References 

Ostallgäu